The Last Bullet is a 1995 Australian film about a Japanese soldier and Australian soldier who fight in World War Two.

The film is set in Borneo, towards the end of WWII. Played by Jason Donovan, the film follows Stanley Brennan, a nineteen-year old recruit and the only survivor of his patrol when they are killed by a Japanese sniper.

References

External links
The Last Bullet at Michael Pattinson website

Australian war drama films
1995 films
1990s English-language films
Australian World War II films
1990s Australian films